Judgement 4 was a professional wrestling event promoted by DDT Pro-Wrestling (DDT). It took place on March 30, 2000, in Tokyo, Japan, at the Kitazawa Town Hall. It was the fourth event under the Judgement name.

Storylines
Judgement 4 featured five professional wrestling matches that involved different wrestlers from pre-existing scripted feuds and storylines. Wrestlers portrayed villains, heroes, or less distinguishable characters in the scripted events that built tension and culminated in a wrestling match or series of matches.

Results

References

External links
The official DDT Pro-Wrestling website

4
2000 in professional wrestling
Professional wrestling in Tokyo